Theater Lindenhof is a theatre in Baden-Württemberg, Germany. It was founded in 1981 in Melchingen, a swabian village near Burladingen. Up to now the theatre is said to be the first and only regional theatre of Germany.

The theatre, its plays or its members (Playwrights, Actors) won about a dozen times several theatre awards, especially in Baden-Württemberg: For example the Friedrich-Hölderlin-Preis of the University Town Tübingen and the Ludwig-Uhland-Preis.

External links 
 official website of Theater Lindenhof (German)
 Chronicle of Theater Lindenhof, including dramatic programs, performances, awards, Festival-appearances etc. (German)

Theatres in Baden-Württemberg
Burladingen